The Forest Home Plantation is a Southern plantation with a  historic house located in Centreville, Mississippi, USA. It spans 1,652 acres.

History
The house was designed in the Greek Revival architectural style circa 1850, when it was acquired by Wilson P. Burton. It was acquired by the Crosby Lumber Company in 1943. In 1962, it was purchased by Charles L. Graves. By the 1980s, it was used as a cattle farm. On Friday, March 6, 2015, an electrical fire blazed out of control and burned to the ground.

Architectural significance
The house has been listed on the National Register of Historic Places since March 19, 1982.

References

Plantation houses in Mississippi
Houses in Wilkinson County, Mississippi
Greek Revival houses in Mississippi
Houses on the National Register of Historic Places in Mississippi
National Register of Historic Places in Wilkinson County, Mississippi